The 1938–1939 SM-Sarja season was played 7 teams from 4 cities making it the largest competition yet. Each team played 6 games each.

SM-Sarja Championship 

KIF wins the 1938–1939 SM-sarja championship

References
 Hockey Archives

Liiga seasons
Fin
1938–39 in Finnish ice hockey
1939 in Finland